Stružnice is a municipality and village in Česká Lípa District in the Liberec Region of the Czech Republic. It has about 1,000 inhabitants.

Administrative parts
Villages of Bořetín, Jezvé and Stráž u České Lípy are administrative parts of Stružnice.

References

Villages in Česká Lípa District